The Tatlong Krus are three crosses on the peak of mount Humarap, part of the mountain of Sierra Madre located in Paete, in the province of Laguna, along the northeastern coast of Luzon island in the Philippines.  The Three Crosses started out with three wooden crosses and now are made of concrete.

References

Concrete sculptures
Buildings and structures in Laguna (province)
Sierra Madre (Philippines)
Monumental crosses
Outdoor sculptures in the Philippines
Wooden sculptures in the Philippines